Barletta is a town and former Metropolitan see in Apulia in south-eastern Italy.
 It was also called Nazareth in Barletta as the new archiepiscopal see of the exiled Metropolitan Archbishops of Nazareth from the crusaders-lost Holy Land, the Roman Catholic Archdiocese of Nazareth in Barletta, which was renamed first Nazareth-Canne in Barletta, then Nazareth-Canne-Monteverde in Barletta, before its suppression.

Barletta can also refer to:
 The Italian auxiliary cruiser Barletta
 Rosso Barletta DOC a red wine originating from close to the town

 Amadeo Barletta Barletta (1894–1975), Italian entrepreneur
 Angelo Barletta (born 1977), German footballer
 Barbara Barletta (1952–2015), American archaeologist 
 Gabriel Barletta (fl. 15th century), Italian Catholic preacher 
 Heraclio Barletta, (1915-1959), Panamanian politician 
 Lou Barletta (born 1956), Italian-American politician
 Mario Barletta (born 1953), Argentine politician
 Sergio Barletta (born 1934), Italian cartoonist